Yézimala is a town in northeastern Ivory Coast. It is a sub-prefecture of Bondoukou Department in Gontougo Region, Zanzan District.

Yézimala was a commune until March 2012, when it became one of 1126 communes nationwide that were abolished.

In 2014, the population of the sub-prefecture of Yézimala was 5,796.

Villages
The seven villages of the sub-prefecture of Yézimala and their population in 2014 are:
 Ampounou (426)
 Gankro (1 364)
 Kogora (293)
 Sananga (321)
 Savagnéré (155)
 Wangalé (549)
 Yézimala (2 688)

Notes

Sub-prefectures of Gontougo
Former communes of Ivory Coast